Hanover is a village in Jo Daviess County, Illinois, United States, along the Apple River. The town was previously named Wapello, in honor of Chief Wapello of the Meskwaki tribe. The population was 844 at the 2010 census, up from 836 in 2000.

Geography 
Hanover is located at  (42.256058, -90.280674).

Hanover sits in the northwest corner of Illinois, within five miles of the Mississippi River. Illinois Route 84, part of the scenic Great River Road, passes through the center of town. The Apple River, a tributary of the Mississippi, winds through and around Hanover.

Demographics 

As of the census of 2000, there were 836 people, 394 households, and 230 families residing in the village. The racial makeup of the village was 97.01% White, 1.24% African American, 0.24% Native American, 0.12% Asian, 0.72% from other races, and 0.67% from two or more races. Hispanic or Latino of any race were 1.20% of the population.

There were 394 households, out of which 23.4% had children under the age of 18 living with them, 42.4% were married couples living together, 13.7% had a female householder with no husband present, and 41.4% were non-families. 37.3% of all households were made up of individuals, and 15.7% had someone living alone who was 65 years of age or older. The average household size was 2.12 and the average family size was 2.78.

In the village, the population was spread out, with 20.8% under the age of 18, 9.3% from 18 to 24, 24.2% from 25 to 44, 26.0% from 45 to 64, and 19.7% who were 65 years of age or older. The median age was 42 years. For every 100 females there were 97.2 males. For every 100 females age 18 and over, there were 91.9 males.

The median income for a household in the village was $29,236, and the median income for a family was $40,893. Males had a median income of $29,375 versus $21,442 for females. The per capita income for the village was $17,535. About 12.9% of families and 14.4% of the population were below the poverty line, including 16.3% of those under age 18 and 13.4% of those age 65 or over.

Education
River Ridge Community Unit School District 210 operates area public schools, including River Ridge High School.

Notable person
Charles W. Woodford, Illinois Treasurer, lived in Hanover.
 Carol C. Cleven, Massachusetts state representative
 Adlai Stevenson III, former U.S. Senator, former Illinois Treasurer, former member of the Illinois House of Representatives, and former farmer in rural Hanover.

References

External links 
Jo Daviess County

Villages in Jo Daviess County, Illinois
Populated places established in 1877
1877 establishments in Illinois